Nietgedacht is a suburb of Johannesburg, South Africa. It is located in Region A of the City of Johannesburg Metropolitan Municipality.

The words 'niet gedacht' translate literally from Dutch into the English words, 'never thought'.

References

Johannesburg Region A